This portion of National Register of Historic Places listings in Puerto Rico covers the municipality of San Juan.

Names of places given are as appear in the National Register, reflecting name as given in NRHP application at the date of listing. Note, the National Register name system does not accommodate Spanish á, ñ and other letters.

Current listings 

|}

See also 

 National Register of Historic Places listings in Puerto Rico
 List of United States National Historic Landmarks in United States commonwealths and territories, associated states, and foreign states
 Historic preservation
 History of Puerto Rico

Notes

References

External links 

 Puerto Rico State Historic Preservation Office, National Register of Historic Places site
 National Park Service, National Register of Historic Places site

San Juan, Puerto Rico
San Juan, Puerto Rico-related lists
San Juan, Puerto Rico